The Federal Court is a Canadian trial court that hears cases arising under certain areas of federal law. The Federal Court is a superior court with nationwide jurisdiction.

History 
The Court was created on July 2, 2003 by the Courts Administration Service Act when it and the Federal Court of Appeal were split from their predecessor, the Federal Court of Canada (which had been created June 1, 1971, through the enactment of the Federal Court Act, subsequently renamed the Federal Courts Act.  The Court's authority comes from the Federal Courts Act.

On October 24, 2008, the Federal Court was given its own armorial bearings by the Governor General, the third court in Canada to be given its own Coat of Arms – after the Court Martial Appeal Court of Canada and Ontario Superior Court of Justice. The coat of arms features a newly created fantastical creature, the winged sea caribou, as the supporters, representing the provision of justice on air, land and sea.

Structure
The Federal Court consists of a Chief Justice, an Associate Chief Justice, and 35 full-time judges, along  with nine supernumerary judges, and eight associate judges. 

Law Clerks are hired for not more than a one-year terms to help the judges research and prepare decisions. They are generally assigned to a particular judge.

Judges' salaries are determined annually by the Judicial Compensation and Benefits Commission. Chief Justice receives $315,900 while other judges receives $288,100 annually.

Jurisdiction
The Federal Court cannot hear any case unless a federal statute confers jurisdiction on the Court to hear cases of that type.

Some examples of the sort of cases heard by the Federal Court are:
 judicial review of immigration decisions,
 judicial review of Veterans Review and Appeal Board of Canada decisions,
 intellectual property disputes,
 cases involving admiralty (maritime) law,
 cases involving federally-regulated industries such as railway tariff disputes
 various aboriginal law matters, and
 claims against the Crown in right of Canada.

These instances of jurisdiction may either be exclusive or concurrent with provincial superior courts, depending on the statute. The Court has the authority to judicially review the decisions made by federal boards, commissions, and administrative tribunals, and to resolve lawsuits by or against the federal government.

More than 50% of the Court's workload consists of immigration and refugee cases.

Decisions of the Federal Court may be appealed to the Federal Court of Appeal. Because it is a superior court of national jurisdiction, judgments are enforceable across Canada without the need for certification by the courts of a specific province.

Judges and Associate Judges

The associate judges of the court by seniority are:
 Mireille Tabib
 Martha Milczynski
 Kevin R. Aalto
 Kathleen Marie Ring
 Alexandra Steele
 Sylvie M. Molgat
 Catherine A. Coughlan
 L.E. Trent Horne

Former judges
Chief Justice
 Allan Lutfy: July 3, 2003 – September 30, 2011

Puisne judges

See also
 Federal Court of Appeal
 Tax Court of Canada

Notes

References

External links
 Federal Court website

2003 establishments in Canada
Federal Court of Canada
Courts and tribunals established in 2003